The Northwood Commercial Historic District encompasses most of the central business district along four blocks of Central Avenue in Northwood, Iowa, United States.  It was listed on the National Register of Historic Places in 2006.  The historic district includes 59 properties.  It includes, as contributing properties, 40 buildings, one site, one structure, and three objects.  There are also 14 buildings that are non-contributing.

The district contains both frame and brick structures that are from one to three stories tall.  Significant structures were built in the Queen Anne and Italianate styles.  Most of the buildings in the historic district were builder/contractor designed.  In the late nineteenth and early twentieth centuries local builders H. Quandahl and James McQuarrie are associated with commercial construction.  A few buildings, however, were the designs of trained architects.  The Holland-Haraldson Block and the Odd Fellows-Erickson Block, were designed respectively by St. Paul, Minnesota architects Omeyer & Thori and J.L. Rood.  Rood may have been designed  the Index Building as well.  The Emery Building was designed by Glenn L. Saxton and Hans Enger, who also had an office in St. Paul.

The site is its location adjacent to a bend on the north shore of the Shell Rock River.  A staircase pathway that leads to flanking stone piers along the river are the contributing structure and one of the objects.  The L.T. Dillon Clock and the Haugen Water Fountain are the other two contributing objects.

References

Buildings and structures in Worth County, Iowa
Historic districts on the National Register of Historic Places in Iowa
National Register of Historic Places in Worth County, Iowa